Smith Road Oval is a cricket ground in George Town, Grand Cayman. It is located on the corner of Smith Road and Huldah Avenue, on the western side of Owen Roberts International Airport.

Smith Road Oval has been used for cricket since 2004. In April 2022, the ground was of one two venues for the first Twenty20 International (T20I) matches to be held in the Cayman Islands, when the Cayman Islands team hosted a bilateral series against Bahamas. These were the first official T20I matches to be played in the Cayman Islands since the International Cricket Council (ICC) granted full T20I status to all competitive matches between its members from 1 January 2019.

References

External links 
 cricHQ

Cricket grounds in the Cayman Islands
Sports venues in the Cayman Islands